The Bălăneasa is a left tributary of the river Buzău in Romania. It discharges into the Buzău near Pârscov. The following villages are situated along the river Bălăneasa, from source to mouth: Brătilești, Brăești, Valea Fântânei, Bozioru, Bălănești, Cozieni, Trestia, Lunca Frumoasă and Pârscov.

Tributaries

The following rivers are tributaries to the river Bălăneasa:
Left: Valea Rea, Murătoarea
Right: Izvorul Călugărului, Gârla Fișicilor, Roata, Nucu

References

Rivers of Romania
Rivers of Buzău County